Łukasz Trałka (born 11 May 1984 in Rzeszów) is a Polish former professional footballer who played mainly as a defensive midfielder. He made 431 Ekstraklasa appearances for Pogoń Szczecin, ŁKS Łódź, Lechia Gdańsk, Polonia Warsaw, Lech Poznań and Warta Poznań, the 5th most of all players in the league's history. He also represented Poland at international level.

Club career

Trałka made his Ekstraklasa debut as a Pogoń Szczecin player on 1 August 2004 in a 1–2 home loss against Legia Warsaw.

From 2012 until 2019, Trałka represented Lech Poznań, where he celebrated his biggest successes, including winning a title in the 2014–15 season. He also served as the team's captain from 2014 until 2017 and briefly in 2018.

On 15 August 2019, Trałka joined I liga side Warta Poznań.  In his first season with the team, he helped them return to Ekstraklasa after 25 years of absence.

He made the final appearance of his career on 14 May 2022 in a 1–2 loss in the Poznań derby against his former club Lech, and was substituted in the 1st minute to a guard of honour from both teams.

International career
He made his debut for the Poland national team in a friendly match against Serbia on 14 December 2008.

Career statistics

Club

1 Including Ekstraklasa Cup.
2 Including Polish Super Cup.

Honours

Club
Lech Poznań
 Ekstraklasa: 2014–15
 Polish Super Cup: 2015, 2016

References

External links
 
 National team stats 
 

1984 births
Living people
People from Rzeszów
Sportspeople from Podkarpackie Voivodeship
Association football midfielders
Polish footballers
Poland international footballers
Poland under-21 international footballers
I liga players
Ekstraklasa players
Concordia Piotrków Trybunalski players
Pogoń Szczecin players
Widzew Łódź players
KSZO Ostrowiec Świętokrzyski players
ŁKS Łódź players
Lechia Gdańsk players
Polonia Warsaw players
Lech Poznań players
Warta Poznań players